A Short Narrative of My Life is an autobiographical account by Rev. Samson Occom (1723–1792) and is one of the earliest English-language writings by a Native American. It was written in 1768.

Synopsis 
At the age of sixteen, ministers began preaching near Occom's tribe, and after hearing the Christian gospel, he converted to Christianity. While learning about the New Testament, he decided he needed to learn to read so he could instruct the poor children and talk to his Indian community about religion. When he was about nineteen, he met Reverend Eleazar Wheelock, who took him under his wing and taught him to read. He stayed with Wheelock for four years until his eyesight was much impaired and his health declined enough that he could not pursue his studies anymore. 

Occom returned to his Mohegan people and began teaching students to read and write. Although he called some students dull because they could not learn their alphabet well, he would make up his own questions and games to help them retain the information. Occom and his students prayed at the beginning and end of every class that God would hear them and help them learn

Analysis and Symbolism 
There were extraordinary ministers preaching from place to place and a strange concern among the white people. This was in the spring of the year. But we saw nothing of these things, till some time in the summer, when some ministers began to visit us and preach the word of God. ~Occom 
In this passage, Occom refers to his first encounters with the Great Awakening, a religious movement that started in Europe and spread throughout the United States and that was strongly dedicated to prayer and to establishing new churches. Occom was touched by the movement and wanted to enlighten others on Christianity. The Awakening brought concern and skepticism among the people, but Occom wanted to put that skepticism away and do what he could to convert others in order to be enlightened.

Samson Occom's work can be compared to Mary Rowlandson's A Narrative of the Captivity and Restoration of Mrs. Mary Rowlandson (1683). Although Occom's was written after Rowlandson's, they have several similarities. Rowlandson wrote about being taken as a captive among the Indians due to the Indians' trying to regain their land from King Philip's War. Occom also wrote about his struggles to break away from his Indian tribe, although his reason was to learn about the word of God and then go back and spread the message to his people. The bible connects the two pieces because Rowlandson and Occom wrote about their experiences with the scriptures and how they tried to influence others with them. Just as Rowlandson shared her Bible with other captives, Samson shared his scriptures with several audiences.

Theme 
The main idea in A Short Narrative of My Life is the Great Awakening and how it is used to transform society. The Awakening was supposed to create more equality between different groups of people, but favoritism was still common. The white preachers were always paid more than the Indian preachers, and during that time the Native Americans were often not allowed to attend the same education classes as others. In order to make a difference, Occom realized he had to do things on his own and make a difference that way. In order to succeed, bold statements were needed. His efforts and those of many others allowed many different people to share the goal of spreading God's word and sharing their beliefs, all of which ultimately helped to make the American Revolution possible.

References

External links
Basic Concepts of the First Great Awakening
Samson Occom: A Short Narrative of My Life (blog entry)
Algonkian Church History
Mary Rowlandson-Captive in 1675-76

Short
American autobiographies
18th-century books